Fiore is a surname. Notable people with the surname include:

Alejandro Fiore (born 1969), Argentine actor
Angelo Aniello Fiore (died c.1500), Italian architect and sculptor
Arlene Fiore, American professor and atmospheric chemist
C. Richard Fiore (1931–2003), American Republican Party politician
Chris Fiore, US film writer, director and producer
Corentin Fiore (born 1995), Belgian footballer of Italian descent
Dave Fiore (born 1972), former American football offensive lineman
Dean Fiore, Australian racing driver
Elena Fiore, Italian actress
Fernando Fiore (born 1960), Argentine television personality 
Genevieve Fiore, American women's rights and peace activist
Giovanni Fiore (born 1996), Canadian professional ice hockey centre
Jasmine Lepore Fiore (1981-2009), American model and murder victim 
Jim Fiore (born 1968), Director of Athletics at Stony Brook University from 2003 to 2013
Joachim of Fiore (c. 1135–1202), Italian theologian
Joseph Fiore (1925–2008), American painter
Kathryn Fiore (born 1979), American actress
Marco Fiore (born 1989), German footballer
Mark Fiore (cartoonist), American political cartoonist
Mark Fiore (footballer) (born 1969), English former professional footballer
Maria Fiore, Italian actress
Mauro Fiore, Italian-American cinematographer
Michele Ann Fiore (born 1970), American Republican politician 
Mike Fiore, (born 1944), American baseball player
Paul Fiore, American Firefighter, Navy Veteran 
Quentin Fiore (1920-2013), American graphic designer
Roberto Fiore (born 1959)), Italian politician 
Sabrina Fiore (born 1996), Paraguayan handball player for the Paraguay national team
Stefano Fiore, Italian football player
Tommaso Fiore (1884–1973), Italian Meridionalist writer and a socialist intellectual 
Toni Fiore, American TV host and cookbook author
Tony Fiore (ice hockey) (born 1962), Canadian-Italian retired professional ice hockey center
Umberto Fiore (1896-1978), Italian politician

See also
Paolo Dellafiore Italian football player

Italian-language surnames